Rangin Jajabara is a 1975 Odia language Indian movie. The music was composed by Akshya Mohanty. It was produced by Bijay Pattnaik, directed by  Akshaya Mohanty, Hemanta Das and Bijay Mishra (Trimurty). It stars Sriram Panda, Banaja Mohanty and Tripura Mishra. Jajabar was the first black-and-white film in Odia to be digitally colourised and re-released in the state.

The film's story is based on the nomad lifestyle. The nomad turned into a human being falls in love, fights for love and wins love fighting with many ifs and buts.

Synopsis
Rashbihari Samantrai is a landlord  who has two sons Anu and Arup. Anu is an industrialist and plans to start an industry in "Sundari Tota", a place owned by his father and inhabited by rural folks. But Rashbihari had promised to donate "Sundari Tota" to his religious guru for building an Ashram. The villagers request Rashbihari not to evacuate them from "Sundari Tota" as they had been living there since years. The second son, Arup, isin love with one of the village girls, Jhili. The villagers revolt back with Jhili's father against the decision to donate the land to his religious guru. At last Arup convinces his father to not donate the land and ends up marrying Jhili.

Cast
 Sriram Panda... Arup Samantrai
 Banaja Mohanty... Jhili
 Tripura Misra... Sujata
 Anita Das... Sunanda
 Hemanta Das... Nilakantha
 Dukhiram Swain... Rasbihari Samantrai
 Samuel Sahu... Jagabandhu
 Shyamalendu Bhattacharjee... Gopi
 Master Mania... Anu Samantrai
 J.N. Das... Brundaban
 Pira Misra... Priest
 Jairam Samal... Sadhu Baba's assistant
 Pratap Rath... Paria
 Preeti Patnaik... Chameli
 Radharani... Aunt
 Bhabani Panda... Clerk
 Pramod Mohanty... Sadhu Baba
 Meera... Brajabasi

Soundtrack

Colourisation
The black and white Oriya film Jajabara was converted to colour. With his team of digital artist, Tilak Ray and 18 roto artists, Bapu Lenka has made an exceptional effort to revive and preserve the loved movie, making it the first black and white regional film of the country to have been colourised.
Never would have been possible without the effort of 21 technocrats and 736 days of time to rework the film. Tilak Ray, the Director of Digital Painting along with his associated roto-artists colourised 2,19,000 frames of the black and white movie.

Awards
 Orissa State Film Awards1975
 Best Actress - Banaja Mohanty

References

External links
 

1975 films
Films scored by Akshaya Mohanty
1970s Odia-language films